Ephistemus globulus is a species of silken fungus beetle native to Europe.

References

External links
Images representing Ephistemus globulus  at BOLD

Cryptophagidae
Beetles described in 1798
Beetles of Europe